The Texas Tech Red Raiders basketball team, representing Texas Tech University, has had 23 players drafted into the National Basketball Association (NBA) since the league began holding drafts in 1947. Tony Battie, taken fifth overall in the 1997 draft, was Texas Tech's only player drafted in the first round until Zhaire Smith was selected 16th overall in the 2018 draft. The Seattle SuperSonics (now the Oklahoma City Thunder) have drafted 3 Red Raiders, more than any other NBA franchise.

Each NBA franchise seeks to add new players through an annual draft. The NBA uses a draft lottery to determine the first three picks of the NBA draft; the 14 teams that did not make the playoffs the previous year are eligible to participate. After the first three picks are decided, the rest of the teams pick in reverse order of their win–loss record. To be eligible for the NBA Draft, a player in the United States must be at least 19 years old during the calendar year of the draft and must be at least one year removed from the graduation of his high school class. From 1967 until the ABA–NBA merger in 1976, the American Basketball Association (ABA) held its own draft.

Drafts

American Basketball Association

National Basketball Association

Notes

References

General

Specific

Texas Tech Red Raiders basketball
Texas Tech Red Raiders
Red Raiders
Texas Tech Red Raiders NBA draft